Roger Alexander Lindsay of Craighall, Baron of Craighall, KStJ, FSA Scot, FRCGS, FRHSC(Hon) is a Chartered Accountant (Institute of Chartered Accountants of Scotland) who is also Rouge Herald of Arms Extraordinary at the Canadian Heraldic Authority.

Personal information

Lindsay is an Aide-de-Camp to the Lieutenant-Governor of Ontario and is a Knight of Justice and a past Vice-Chancellor, Governance and the past Chief of Protocol of the Priory of Canada of Order of St John and served until recently as a trustee, director, and secretary of The W. Garfield Weston Foundation. He has served as both a national trustee of The Presbyterian Church in Canada and as convener of the Board of Governors of Knox College, in the University of Toronto. He has also served as the Moderator of the Presbytery of East Toronto. He holds the Queen Elizabeth II Golden Jubilee Medal & the Queen Elizabeth II Diamond Jubilee Medal and the long-time service medal with bars [2] of Order of St John. He was created Rouge Herald Extraordinary of Canada on 11 October 2006. He has also been awarded the Vice Regal Commendation, The Chancellor's Commendation [ of St. John Canada ] and The Chairman's Commendation [ of Ontario Council of St. John.] He held the appointment [ from 2007 to 2014 ] as the Honorary Colonel of The Windsor Regiment (RCAC). He is also a Fellow of The Chartered Management Institute, The Institute of Corporate Directors, The Society of Antiquaries of Scotland, The Royal Canadian Geographical Society and is an Honorary Fellow of The Royal Heraldry Society of Canada & Patron of its Toronto Branch [ Installed 2019 ]

Coat of arms

Lindsay was granted a coat of arms by Lord Lyon King of Arms in 1987. The shield is blazoned Gules a Fess chequy Azure and Argent between a Lion passant guardant and a Pot of three growing Lilies Argent. He was also granted the crest of the Head Neck and Wings of a Swan Or charged with a Maple Leaf Gules and the motto "Festina Lente". This translates to "hasten slowly." 
These arms were registered in 1997 by the Canadian Heraldic Authority.  
In 2004 the Lord Lyon King of Arms made a further grant based on the original 1987 arms which includes the additaments particular to a Scottish Barony together with a Standard of that particular rank.

External links
 Canadian Heraldic Authority
 W Garfield Weston Foundation
 Royal Heraldry Society of Canada

References

Living people
Year of birth missing (living people)
Canadian accountants
Canadian officers of arms
Canadian Heraldic Authority
Fellows of the Society of Antiquaries of Scotland